Kranji Station (KRI) is a class III railway station located in Kranji, West Bekasi, Bekasi, West Java. The station, which is located at an altitude of +18 m, is included in the Operation Area I Jakarta and is the westernmost railway station in Bekasi City and West Java for the Rajawali–Cikampek railway, as well as the northernmost in West Java. This station only serves the Cikarang Loop Line.

To the west from this station, before Cakung Station, there used to be Rawabebek Station which has now been demolished due to low occupancy.

Building and layout
This station has four train lines, one pair for KRL Commuterline services and another pair for long-distance/non-KRL trains to pass through.

Since 8 January 2019, this station has used a new building located on top of the old station building, with a futuristic modern minimalist architecture, the station layout was changed from two railway tracks flanked by side platforms to two railway tracks with an island platform in the middle.

Services
The following is a list of train services at the Kranji Station.

Passenger services 
 KAI Commuter
  Cikarang Loop Line (Full Racket)
  Cikarang Loop Line (Half Racket), to / (via  and ) and

Supporting transportation

References

External links

Bekasi
Railway stations in West Java